The 1977 Stanford Cardinals football team represented Stanford University in the Pacific-8 Conference during the 1977 NCAA Division I football season. Led by first-year head coach Bill Walsh, Stanford ended the regular season with an 8–3 record (5–2 in Pac-8, tie for second).

The Cardinals were led by senior quarterback Guy Benjamin, who won the Sammy Baugh Trophy, awarded to the best passer in college football; senior receiver James Lofton, who caught 57 passes for 1,010 yards and 14 TDs and was named an AP and NEA Second Team All-American; junior linebacker Gordy Ceresino, and freshman running back Darrin Nelson.

On New Year's Eve, Stanford defeated LSU 24–14 in the Sun Bowl for their ninth win.
and climbed to fifteenth in the final rankings.

Walsh, previously the offensive coordinator of the NFL's San Diego Chargers, was hired the previous December. He had been an assistant at Stanford under John Ralston from 1963 through 1965 and spent eight seasons as an assistant with the expansion Cincinnati Bengals under head coach Paul Brown.

Schedule

Roster

Awards and honors
 Guy Benjamin, Sammy Baugh Trophy
 James Lofton, AP and NEA Second Team All-American selection

All-conference

NFL Draft
Four Cardinals were selected in the 1978 NFL Draft.

List of Stanford Cardinal in the NFL Draft

References

Stanford
Stanford Cardinal football seasons
Sun Bowl champion seasons
Stanford Cardinals football